Jill Nelson (born June 14, 1952) is a prominent African-American journalist and novelist. She has written several books, including the autobiographical Volunteer Slavery: My Authentic Negro Experience, which won an American Book Award. She was Professor of Journalism at the City College of New York from 1998 to 2003.

Biography
Born in Harlem, Jill Nelson grew up in New York's West Side, spending summers on Martha's Vineyard. Her brother is filmmaker Stanley Nelson. She graduated from the City College of New York and went on to study at the Columbia School of Journalism. Nelson wrote for the Washington Post Magazine at its inception, and was awarded the Washington D.C. Journalist of the Year for her contributions. Her work has also appeared in The New York Times, Essence, The Nation, Ms., the Chicago Tribune, the Village Voice, USA Today, USA Weekend, and msnbc.com.

Nelson wrote the autobiographical Volunteer Slavery: My Authentic Negro Experience (1993) about her experiences as a black female journalist at the Washington Post. Her 1997 book Straight, No Chaser: How I Became A Grown-Up Black Woman, also autobiographical, discussed role models for black women.

Her first work of fiction, Sexual Healing, was published in 2003.

List of works
Volunteer Slavery: My Authentic Negro Experience 1993. Hardback ; Softback 
Straight, No Chaser: How I Became A Grown-Up Black Woman. 1997. 
Editor, Police Brutality: An Anthology. 2000. 
Sexual Healing. 2003. Hardback ; paperback 
Finding Martha's Vineyard: African Americans at Home on an Island. 2005. 
Let's Get It On. 2009.

References

External links
 Jill Nelson Author Profile, African American Literature Book Club.

1952 births
Living people
20th-century American novelists
African-American novelists
American women novelists
City College of New York faculty
Columbia University Graduate School of Journalism alumni
American memoirists
African-American non-fiction writers
American women memoirists
American women journalists
20th-century American women writers
21st-century American women writers
PEN Oakland/Josephine Miles Literary Award winners
American Book Award winners
Novelists from New York (state)
20th-century American non-fiction writers
21st-century American non-fiction writers
20th-century African-American women writers
20th-century African-American writers
21st-century African-American women
21st-century African-American people